In molecular biology, RFPL3 antisense RNA 1 (non-protein coding), also known as RFPL3-AS1 is a long non-coding RNA. In humans, it is on chromosome 22. It is antisense to the RFPL3 gene encoding a RING finger domain-containing protein. It may function in the post-transcriptional regulation of this gene.

See also
 Long noncoding RNA

References

Non-coding RNA